Chymotrypsin-like protease CTRL-1 is an enzyme that in humans is encoded by the CTRL gene.

References

External links

Further reading